Keidrich Sellati (born ) is an American actor. He played the role of Henry Jennings in the FX television series The Americans (2013–2018) for its entire run.

Life and career 
Sellati has been described as having Korean, Irish, Italian, and English ancestry.

In 2013, Sellati joined the cast of the 1980s period drama The Americans as Henry Jennings, the son of two Soviet spies. He continued in the role until its final season in 2018. Referring to himself and co-star Holly Taylor, Sellati said "we were adorable, but in an ugly way". Sellati was part of The Americans ensemble that was nominated for Outstanding Performance by an Ensemble in a Drama Series at the 25th Screen Actors Guild Awards in 2019.

In 2017, Sellati portrayed Anthony in the film Rockaway. The film was about a brother plotting revenge against his abusive father and spending time in East Rockaway, New York. According to director John J. Budion, Sellati was similar to his real-life brother, and he praised the actor for conveying Anthony's feelings during the auditions. Sellati was named Best Actor at the 2018 Sunscreen Film Festival.

Sellati attended public school in New York City, graduating from high school in 2020. He has interest in cybersecurity as a career.

In 2020, Sellati played a role in Keke Palmer's "Dreamcatcher" music video.

Filmography

Film

Television

Music videos

References

External links 

 

Living people
Male actors from Colorado
21st-century American male actors
American male child actors
American male film actors
American male television actors
Year of birth missing (living people)